Mohammad Rizal bin Tisin (born 20 June 1984 in Klang, Selangor) is a Malaysian professional track cyclist. He represented his nation Malaysia at the 2008 Summer Olympics, and later established the nation's historic milestone as the first Malaysian to claim a track cycling medal at the 2009 UCI World Championships and at the 2010 Commonwealth Games.

Racing career
Tisin qualified for the Malaysian squad in the men's team sprint at the 2008 Summer Olympics in Beijing by  receiving a berth for his team based on the nation's selection process from the UCI Track World Rankings. Tisin, along with his teammates Azizulhasni Awang and Josiah Ng, posted a sterling Malaysian record of 44.725 and an average speed of 60.368 km/h to grab a seventh spot for his team from the opening prelims, before losing out to France (44.822) in the first round match.

In 2009, Tisin established the nation's historic milestone by claiming the bronze for Malaysia in the men's four-lap kilometre time trial (a national record of 1:01.658) at the UCI Track Cycling World Championships in Pruszków, Poland.

At the 2010 Commonwealth Games in Delhi, India, Tisin redrafted his cycling career resume as he took home the silver in the men's 1 km time trial (1:02.768), following shortly by his team campaign with a bronze medal effort in the men's sprint race (45.378). A month later, at the Asian Games in Guangzhou, Tisin and his teammates Awang and Ng could not replicate a striking effort in the same event after losing out the bronze medal match to Iran.

Tisin continued further to reach the summit of his career when he managed to add two more medals, including his gold in the 1 km time trial, at the 2011 Asian Cycling Championships in Nakhon Ratchasima, Thailand. Shortly after his fruitful success, Tisin sought his intention to return to the BMX track cycling, where he started his sporting career as a teenager. Tisin's hopes and decision to temporarily leave his sporting discipline were thereby pinned on selection for the 2012 Summer Olympics.

In June 2013, Tisin ended his short lapse to focus again on track cycling and gear up for future international competitions, following an unsatisfactory result and his decision to miss an opportunity for his second Olympic bid.

Career highlights

2008
 7th Olympic Games (Team sprint with Azizulhasni Awang and Josiah Ng),  Beijing (CHN)
2009
  UCI World Championships (1 km time trial), Pruszków (POL)
 6th UCI World Championships (Team sprint), Pruszków (POL)
2010
  Commonwealth Games (1 km time trial), Delhi (IND)
  Commonwealth Games (Team sprint with Azizulhasni Awang and Josiah Ng), Delhi (IND)
 4th Asian Games (Team sprint with Azizulhasni Awang and Josiah Ng), Guangzhou (CHN)
2011
  Asian Championships (1 km time trial), Nakhon Ratchasima (THA)
  Asian Championships (Team sprint), Nakhon Ratchasima (THA)
 11th UCI World Championships (1 km time trial), Apeldoorn (NED)
 15th UCI World Championships (Team sprint), Apeldoorn (NED)
 42nd UCI World Championships (Keirin), Apeldoorn (NED)

References

External links
NBC 2008 Olympics profile

1984 births
Living people
People from Selangor
Malaysian male cyclists
Malaysian track cyclists
Malaysian people of Malay descent
Malaysian Muslims
Cyclists at the 2008 Summer Olympics
Cyclists at the 2006 Asian Games
Cyclists at the 2010 Asian Games
Cyclists at the 2010 Commonwealth Games
Olympic cyclists of Malaysia
Cyclists at the 2014 Commonwealth Games
Commonwealth Games silver medallists for Malaysia
Commonwealth Games bronze medallists for Malaysia
Commonwealth Games medallists in cycling
Southeast Asian Games medalists in cycling
Southeast Asian Games gold medalists for Malaysia
Competitors at the 2007 Southeast Asian Games
Asian Games competitors for Malaysia
Medallists at the 2010 Commonwealth Games